Karen Julia Josephson (born January 10, 1964) is an American Olympic champion and former competitor in synchronized swimming.

Karen Josephson partnered with her twin sister Sarah Josephson to win a silver medal in the women's duet at the 1988 Summer Olympics in Seoul and then a gold medal in the same event with at the 1992 Summer Olympics in Barcelona.

She won silver medals in the duet and team events at the 1986 World Championships in Madrid. At the 1991 World Championships in Perth she won gold medals in same events.

Josephson also competed at the 1987 Pan American Game in Indianapolis, winning gold medals in duet and team events.

See also
 List of members of the International Swimming Hall of Fame

References

External links 
 
 
 
 

1964 births
Living people
American synchronized swimmers
Olympic gold medalists for the United States in synchronized swimming
Olympic silver medalists for the United States in synchronized swimming
Synchronized swimmers at the 1988 Summer Olympics
Synchronized swimmers at the 1992 Summer Olympics
Medalists at the 1988 Summer Olympics
Medalists at the 1992 Summer Olympics
World Aquatics Championships medalists in synchronised swimming
Synchronized swimmers at the 1986 World Aquatics Championships
Synchronized swimmers at the 1991 World Aquatics Championships
Pan American Games medalists in synchronized swimming
Pan American Games gold medalists for the United States
Synchronized swimmers at the 1987 Pan American Games
People from Bristol, Connecticut
American twins
Twin sportspeople
Medalists at the 1987 Pan American Games
20th-century American women